The Kerry Minor Hurling Championship (known for sponsorship reasons as Keane’s SuperValu Killorglin Kerry County Minor Hurling Championship) is an annual hurling competition organised by the Kerry County Board of the Gaelic Athletic Association for the top Under 17 (previously Under 18) hurling teams in the county of Kerry in Ireland. The first championship was held in 1947 and was won by a North Kerry selection comprising players from the Crotta O'Neill's, Lixnaw and Ballyduff clubs.

The series of games are played during the summer months, with the county final usually being played in Austin Stack Park.

A number of championships were awarded by the Co. Board following an objection, often due to the presence of an over-age or illegal player. The ultimate outcome of the 1967 championship is not known with the final subject to Co, Board and Munster Council hearings and appeals. The 1970 championship was unfinished.

Trophy
The Seán Lovett Cup was presented to the championship winners for the first time in 1990, when, perhaps appropriately, Kilmoyley succeeded in retaining the title. This Cup commemorates a great Kilmoyley hurler and club man who also played hurling and football with Kerry from the late 1940s to the 1960s. Previously the Corn Mac Giolla Dia in memory of a former Kerry hurler, Patrick Godley of Ballyheigue, had been awarded to the winners from 1960 onwards. This trophy was presented to the County Board by friends of the late Mr Godley from Chicago.

Roll of honour

Finals listed by year

References

GAA County Championships
Hurling competitions in Ireland
Hurling competitions in County Kerry